Sajjad Hussain may refer to:

Sajjad Hussain (cricketer, born 1980), born Mohammed Sajjad Zaheer Hussain, former cricketer from Assam and Tripura states of India
Sajjad Hussain (cricketer, born 1986), Pakistani cricketer 
Sajjad Hussain (composer) (1917-1995), Indian film score composer
Sajjad Hussain (footballer), Sri Lanken footballer